In human psychology, the breaking point is a moment of stress in which a person breaks down or a situation becomes critical. The intensity of environmental stress necessary to bring this about varies from individual to individual.

Interrogation

Getting someone to confess to a crime during an interrogation – whether innocent or guilty – means the suspect has been broken. The key to breaking points in interrogation has been linked to changes in the victim's concept of self – changes which may be precipitated by a sense of helplessness, by lack of preparedness or an underlying sense of guilt, as well (paradoxically) as by an inability to acknowledge one's own vulnerabilities.

Life
Psychoanalysts like Ronald Fairbairn and Neville Symington considered that everybody has a potential breaking point in life, with vulnerability particularly intense at early developmental stages.

Some psychoanalysts say that rigid personalities may be able to endure great stress before suddenly cracking open.

See also
Abreaction
Psychotic break

Bibliography

References

External links
Dealing with Psychological Crisis

Figures of speech
Psychological stress